Sonia Rosa Chang-Díaz (born March 31, 1978) is an American politician who serves in the Massachusetts Senate from the 2nd Suffolk district as a member of the Democratic Party. She was the first Hispanic woman elected to the state senate. She ran for the Democratic nomination for Governor of Massachusetts in the 2022 election.

Chang-Díaz was educated at the University of Virginia. She entered politics while serving as a legislature aide for Massachusetts Senator Cheryl Jacques and as a campaign manager for MassEquality. She attempted to win election to the state senate in the 2006 election as a write-in candidate in the Democratic primary, but lost to incumbent Senator Dianne Wilkerson, who was also running as a write-in candidate. She ran again in the 2008 election and defeated Wilkerson in the primary and general elections.

Early life

Sonia Chang-Díaz was born in Boston, Massachusetts, on March 31, 1978, to Franklin Chang-Díaz, a NASA astronaut. She graduated from the University of Virginia. She worked as one of Senator Cheryl Jacques' legislative aides and was a campaign manager for MassEquality.

Massachusetts Senate

Elections
Massachusetts Senator Dianne Wilkerson failed to file her nomination petition with enough valid signatures to appear on the ballot in the Democratic primary during the 2006 election, but announced that she would run a write-in campaign for the Democratic nomination. Chang-Díaz announced on June 18, 2006, that she would run as a write-in candidate in the primary. Wilkerson defeated Chang-Díaz in the initial primary, but a judge ordered a recount due to write-in votes not being counted in eight precincts. Secretary of State William F. Galvin started an investigation into Boston's handling of elections due to the error. Chang-Díaz turned in enough signatures for a recount of all ten wards. The final recount determined that Wilkerson had won by 767 votes which was more than the initial 141 votes. Wilkerson won reelection in the general election.

Chang-Díaz ran against Wilkerson in the 2008 Democratic primary and defeated Wilkerson. A recount was conducted and maintained Chang-Díaz's victory. Wilkerson launched a write-in campaign in the general election, but withdrew after she was arrested on charges of public corruption and Chang-Díaz defeated Wilkerson and independent candidate William Theodore Leonard in the general election. She was the first Hispanic woman elected to the Massachusetts Senate.

She won reelection without opposition in the 2010, 2012, 2016, 2018, and 2020 elections. She defeated Republican nominee David James Wyatt in the 2014 election.

Tenure

During Chang-Díaz's tenure in the Massachusetts Senate she served as the chair of the Education committee, vice-chair of the Senate Redistricting committee, and assistant vice-chair of the Ways and Means committee. She was speculated as a possible candidate for the 2013 Boston mayoral election, but did not run and instead endorsed Marty Walsh. She endorsed Donald Berwick for the Democratic nomination in the 2014 gubernatorial election. She endorsed Senator Ed Markey in the Democratic primary during the 2020 United States Senate election. During the 2020 Democratic presidential primaries Chang-Díaz endorsed Senator Elizabeth Warren.

Chang-Díaz announced on June 23, 2021, that she would seek the Democratic nomination in the 2022 gubernatorial election, but ended her campaign on June 23, 2022, although she remains on the ballot.

Political positions

Chang-Díaz was critical of legislation passed by the Massachusetts Senate which targeted the ability of undocumented immigrants to obtain services from the state including Medicaid and public housing. She opposed casinos stating that they were "a fancy way of putting a tax on the poor." Chang-Díaz supported raising the income tax to increase education funding.

She sponsored legislation to include transgender people in Massachusetts's anti-discrimination laws in 2011. She supported legislation which allowed people to use gendered-public places that matched their gender identity and gave protections against discrimination for transgender people.

Electoral history

References

External links

 Legislative website
 State House website
 Campaign website

1978 births
21st-century American politicians
21st-century American women politicians
American politicians of Costa Rican descent
American women of Chinese descent in politics
Asian-American people in Massachusetts politics
Hispanic and Latino American state legislators in Massachusetts
Hispanic and Latino American women in politics
Living people
Democratic Party Massachusetts state senators
People from Jamaica Plain
University of Virginia alumni
Women state legislators in Massachusetts